Willem Jacobus le Roux (born 18 August 1989) is a South African rugby union player. He is a versatile back-line player who generally plays as a fullback or wing, though earlier in his career he played mostly as a fly-half. He plays for the South Africa national team and for Toyota Verblitz in the Top League. He was born in Stellenbosch.

Club career
He spent 2 years with the Cavaliers, helping them to lift the 2011 Currie Cup First Division title in his final appearance. He moved north to join the  along with several of his Boland team-mates in 2012 and started 9 of the Peacock Blues 10 games during his debut season in Kimberley. After a rocky start in which he was sin-binned for a dangerous tackle on full-back Jurgen Visser and subsequently suspended for Griquas second match of the season Le Roux established himself as one of the top players in South African domestic rugby.

Despite this early setback Le Roux went on to have an excellent first season
in Super Rugby, playing mostly on the wing he scored 7 tries in 16 appearances. His second season proved even more successful as he helped the Cheetahs reach the play-offs with a further 6 tries in 17 matches.

In July 2013, it was announced that Le Roux had signed a new contract with the  until the end of 2015, which also meant that he would play for the  domestically from 2014 onwards.

In August 2016, English Premiership side Wasps announced Le Roux would join them in January 2017 after finishing his commitments with the Canon Eagles. He left Wasps in 2019 having played 46 games and scoring 50 points.

On 5 May 2019 Le Roux returned to Japan to sign for Toyota Verblitz in the Top League from the 2019–20 season.

International career
He played the full 80 minutes of all three test matches against these teams with distinction, hardly faltering any time at full-back, and contributed to the try-making by joining the Springbok backline in sprints for the opponents' tryline.

He also played an integral part in South Africa's 2013 Rugby Championship campaign, featuring in all six matches.

Le Roux started the 2013 end-of-year tests on the bench for the match against , however an injury to starting fly-half Morne Steyn saw him enter to the fray as an early substitute in the full-back position. It was a position he was to retain for the remaining two tour matches. He turned in a particularly impressive display in the 28-0 destruction of  scoring one intercept try and setting up another immediately from the restart for team-mate JP Pietersen.

On 14 June 2014, Le Roux produced a man-of-the-match performance to help  beat  during the 2014 incoming tours, scoring a try and providing three assists.

In 2014, he was one of five nominees for the IRB Player of the Year award.

Le Roux was named in South Africa's squad for the 2019 Rugby World Cup. South Africa went on to win the tournament, defeating England in the final.

Springbok statistics

Test Match record 

Pld = Games Played, W = Games Won, D = Games Drawn, L = Games Lost, Tri = Tries Scored, Con = Conversions, Pen = Penalties, DG = Drop Goals, Pts = Points Scored

International Tries

Super Rugby statistics

Notes

References

External links
 
 

Living people
1989 births
South African rugby union players
South Africa international rugby union players
Cheetahs (rugby union) players
Griquas (rugby union) players
Boland Cavaliers players
Rugby union wings
Rugby union fullbacks
People from Stellenbosch
Afrikaner people
Yokohama Canon Eagles players
South African expatriate rugby union players
South African expatriate sportspeople in France
Expatriate rugby union players in Japan
Alumni of Paul Roos Gymnasium
Sharks (rugby union) players
Wasps RFC players
Toyota Verblitz players
Rugby union players from the Western Cape